Chelotriton is an extinct genus of prehistoric salamanders that lived in Europe and Central Asia during the Neogene. It closely resembles the extant genera Tylototriton and Echinotriton.

References

External links

Salamandridae
Miocene amphibians
Neogene amphibians of Europe
Fossil taxa described in 1853
Taxa named by Auguste Pomel
Prehistoric amphibian genera